Lars Nymo Trulsen (born 28 April 1976) is a retired Norwegian football defender.

He grew up in Målselv, and made his debut for Målselv IL in 1993. He then played for Finnsnes IL from 1996 to 1999. Ahead of the 2000 season he signed for regional greats Tromsø IL. He made his debut in July 2000 against FK Bodø/Glimt, and got three Norwegian Premier League games; the last in July 2001. He played the 2002 season for IF Skarp, then joined Tromsdalen UIL.  He retired after the 2006 season.

References

Norwegian footballers
Tromsø IL players
Tromsdalen UIL players
People from Målselv
1976 births
Living people
Association football defenders
Sportspeople from Troms og Finnmark
21st-century Norwegian people